The Winnowing Oar (athereloigos - Greek ἀθηρηλοιγός) is an object that appears in Books  XI and XXIII of Homer's Odyssey. In the epic, Odysseus is instructed by Tiresias to take an oar from his ship and to walk inland until he finds a "land that knows nothing of the sea", where the oar would be mistaken for a winnowing fan. At this point, he is to offer a sacrifice to Poseidon, and then at last his journeys would be over.

In popular culture
 In 2003 the artist Conrad Shawcross created a work, Winnowing Oar, based on the object. Sculpted in oak, spruce and ash, it is an imaginary tool with a winnowing fan at one end and an oar blade at the other. It formed part of the Shawcross' 2004 Continuum exhibition at the National Maritime Museum.
The metaphor is used in the TV series Black Sails.

References

External links
An essay on the winnowing-fan and its meaning
Lance Hosey, Poseidon's Oar
Poseidon’s Oar : Lance Hosey

Mythological objects
Odyssey
Rowing equipment
Poseidon